The 2010 British Grand Prix (formally the 2010 Formula 1 Santander British Grand Prix) was the tenth race of the 2010 Formula One season. On 7 December 2009, it was confirmed that the race would take place at Silverstone for the next seventeen years after the failure of Donington Park to raise the necessary funds to hold the race. The event was staged on 11 July, the same day as the 2010 FIFA World Cup final (as also happened in 1990 and 1998).
The race was won by Red Bull driver Mark Webber, taking his third victory of the season.

This was the last time until the 2014 Japanese Grand Prix that Ferrari did not score a point.

Race location
The 2009 British Grand Prix was due to be the last held at the Silverstone Circuit. Donington Park was due to hold the race from 2010 but was unable to find the money to redevelop its circuit due to financial problems. On 29 October 2009 Bernie Ecclestone confirmed that there will be no British Grand Prix at Donington Park. Silverstone subsequently signed a 17-year deal to hold the race from 2010 onwards. Under this deal, the pit lane and paddock will be redeveloped with work starting as soon as possible after Christmas 2009 to be completed in 2011. The new track layout for the race featured a new complex of corners known as the "Arena" layout. The new corners from Abbey have been named; Farm, Village, The Loop, Aintree and the Wellington Straight leading to Brooklands on the old layout. This was also the last race to use the pit complex between Woodcote and Copse corners; the basic structure of the new complex was visible between Club and Abbey, and was used for the first time the following year.

Report

Background

Sakon Yamamoto returned to a race seat after Hispania Racing decided to drop Bruno Senna in favour of the former Super Aguri and Spyker driver for reasons that remained undisclosed as the weekend began. Team principal Colin Kolles claimed that the switch was not related to sponsorship; the only new sponsor for the team was the Jaypee Group, owners of the new Jaypee Group Circuit in India, and attracted to the team by Karun Chandhok. Senna refused to speak on the subject, whilst Yamamoto claimed he would "talk" to the Brazilian driver, prompting speculation that the team was experiencing internal troubles and that Yamamoto's appointment had come after Senna had criticised the team in an internal e-mail. Nevertheless, the team refused to comment on why the change had been made and confirmed that Senna would return to his seat at Hockenheim.

Other line-up changes for the first practice session saw Paul di Resta stand in for Vitantonio Liuzzi at Force India and Fairuz Fauzy take over Jarno Trulli's driving duties at Lotus. The race also saw Virgin bring their most significant upgrade of the season, whilst Lotus brought their final update for 2010 as the team shifted its focus to the 2011 car.

The new addition to the circuit was well-received, but several drivers requested that changes be made to the high kerbs through the Maggotts-Becketts complex, one of the fastest corner combinations on the Formula One calendar.

The drivers' representative on the stewards' panel was Nigel Mansell.

Free practice
The Friday free practice sessions marked the first time the drivers experienced the new layout. The reception was mixed, with Mark Webber and Fernando Alonso enthusiastic about it, while Robert Kubica and Heikki Kovalainen expressed a preference for the older circuit. Almost every driver commented on a large bump on the approach to the reprofiled Abbey turn, with some drivers claiming it was potentially better than Copse corner.

The Friday sessions were once again dominated by the Red Bulls, with Vettel posting the fastest time in the first session and Webber in the second. The new layout caught several drivers out, with Lewis Hamilton and Michael Schumacher running wide at Abbey. Whether a byproduct of the new layout or another factor, the Friday session produced some unusual times, with the Ferraris of Alonso and Massa struggling to find any real pace in the first session, whilst Renault's Vitaly Petrov was quicker than teammate Kubica. In both sessions, just four drivers were within a second of the leader. Elsewhere, the new teams experienced troubles. While Lotus' Heikki Kovalainen slowly ate away at the difference to the established teams, Sakon Yamamoto was the slowest of the twenty-four drivers, seven and a half seconds off the pace. After surrendering his car to test driver Fairuz Fauzy for the first session, Jarno Trulli was hampered by reliability problems and limiting his time on the new layout before Kovalainen's car expired on the circuit late in the session.

The third and final session on Saturday morning continued the trend, with Sebastian Vettel returning to the top of the time sheets, with Mark Webber a close second; both drivers were the only two men to break the 1min 31sec barrier all weekend. Several drivers were hampered with mechanical issues, with Trulli losing more time to hydraulics problems, as did Adrian Sutil. Timo Glock also had little on-track time after this VR-01 fell victim to a throttle problem. Vettel also suffered his own mechanical problem when his front wing detached itself on the high-speed approach to Abbey late in the hour. The young German driver was able to slow the car down and prevent an accident, and his time remained unbeaten for the last few minutes of the session.

Qualifying
The beginning of qualifying was marked by controversy following Vettel's wing failure. Red Bull had brought a new aerodynamic package to the race that included a new front wing, and team principal Christian Horner made the decision to remove the new front wing from Webber's car and give it to Vettel. This prompted an angry outburst from the Australian, with public perception being that Red Bull had robbed Webber for the sake of favouring Vettel, particularly following the aftermath of their collision in Istanbul. Otherwise, the first session saw the elimination of Jaime Alguersuari and the Lotuses, Virgins and Hispanias. Timo Glock edged out Kovalainen in the dying moments to qualify as the best of the newcomers, only to have Kovalainen take the place back moments later.

The second session saw the elimination of Jenson Button, with commentator Martin Brundle noting that the McLaren MP4-25 was incredibly rough over the bumps in the circuit, particularly on the approach to the new section. The Renaults of Robert Kubica and Vitaly Petrov also struggled despite their promising form in practice, and while Kubica just made it through to Q3, Petrov's session ended early when the car developed a fuel problem. Although the team were able to get the Russian out for one final lap at the end of the session, it was a sedate effort that only elevated him to sixteenth. Following the worst qualifying performance of his career in Valencia, Michael Schumacher set the fifth-fastest time of the session, with the team attributing their recent run of poor results to upgrading the car without fully understanding the effects of their new parts. Vitantonio Liuzzi was issued with a five-place penalty after qualifying for impeding Nico Hülkenberg when the Italian violently cut across the Williams driver as he made a mistake at Abbey. At the end of the session, Adrian Sutil had qualified eleventh, ahead of Kamui Kobayashi, Hülkenberg, Button, Petrov and Sébastien Buemi, with Liuzzi relegated to twentieth place after his penalty.

The final session was dominated by Red Bull, with Vettel and Webber going blow-for-blow. The German prevailed by a tenth of a second, prompting Webber's outburst, with the Australian expressing extreme dissatisfaction with lining up on the dirty side of the grid, which had traditionally been a bad starting place at Silverstone. Fernando Alonso out-qualified Lewis Hamilton after the Briton somehow managed to overcome the troubles experienced by teammate Button, with Nico Rosberg fifth. Despite earlier problems – suspected of being related to the car being caught in a crosswind – Robert Kubica managed sixth ahead of Felipe Massa, Rubens Barrichello and Pedro de la Rosa, the Spaniard's first time in Q3 all season. Michael Schumacher had to settle for the tenth and final place on the grid after only doing one lap as he had only had one set of tyres left over.

In addition to Liuzzi's penalty, Jaime Alguersuari was fined five thousand dollars for an unsafe pit release, and Sakon Yamamoto was warned for slowing other drivers.

Race
The race began with Sebastian Vettel attempting to force teammate Webber into yielding on the approach to Copse corner, but the Australian prevailed and Vettel ran wide as he made contact with Lewis Hamilton in third. As the field passed through the Maggotts-Becketts corner, Vettel was seen to run wide, having picked up a puncture from the contact with Hamilton as Webber and the Briton escaped the rest of the field. Other first-lap incidents saw Felipe Massa earn a puncture after contact in the new section, and the two drivers were forced to pit, shunting them to the back end of the field.

The first casualty of the race was Lucas di Grassi, his VR-01 once again crippled by hydraulics failure, while at the front of the pack, Hamilton kept in touch with Webber as they raced on the softer tyre. His teammate Button was able to carve his way through the field, having started fourteenth. The early phase of the race was marked by another minor stewarding controversy as Fernando Alonso attempted to pass the struggling Robert Kubica on the entry to Vale. Alonso was forced off the circuit and recovered to take the second half of Club corner, but passed Kubica in the process. Alonso was given a drive-through penalty for failing to give the place back to Kubica, but problems began when Adrian Sutil made contact with Pedro de la Rosa on the main straight. Although both drivers were able to continue for the time being, de la Rosa's rear wing was damaged and it started to disintegrate as the Sauber took to the Hangar straight. He pitted and was released back into the race, but it was a mortal wound and de la Rosa was forced to retire. The debris on the circuit at the approach to Stowe prompted the deployment of the safety car, bunching the field back up. This was a problem for Alonso because he was unable to serve his drive-through penalty until after the safety car had withdrawn, sending him plummeting back down the order. Reactions from the commentators were unsympathetic, with many feeling that Alonso could have avoided trouble by giving the place back to Kubica at the earliest possible opportunity. Nevertheless, it was still described as a harsh penalty because Kubica had been forced out of the race with driveshaft problems before the de la Rosa-Sutil incident. Charlie Whiting, the FIA's race director, later told reporters that Alonso and Ferrari had been advised to yield to Kubica as soon as the Spaniard had passed the Renault, and twice more after that before the penalty was issued. Ferrari later released a timeline of the Alonso-Kubica pass and following events, showing that Charlie Whiting had told them he "had to look at pictures" and did not recommend Alonso return the position until a full two minutes after the controversial pass (critically after Alonso had already passed Alguersuari). The decision not to allow Kubica pass immediately after was a key moment in the championship, the lost points ultimately cost Alonso the championship.

The unintended effect of the safety car deployment was that it bunched the field up again. Sebastian Vettel, who had been just three seconds ahead of Mark Webber on the road, was able to join the rear of the safety car train and proceeded to wage war against the rest of the grid, picking them off one by one. Several other battles also picked up, with Alonso and Liuzzi bashing wheels and Petrov threatening Nico Hülkenberg's tenth place until the Russian developed a slow puncture and was forced to pit. Meanwhile, Vettel continued his charge, made more complicated by the retirement of Jaime Alguersuari. The Toro Rosso driver beached himself at low speed on the outside of Luffield with eight laps to go, prompting marshalls to display yellow flags at the end of the new Wellington Straight and thus denying Vettel the opportunity to pass countryman Sutil into Brooklands. Vettel eventually bullied his way through, forcing a gap at Aintree several laps later. Sutil was left unimpressed by the pass as he came under fire from Schumacher, who himself had to fend off the tenth-placed Nico Hülkenberg.

Mark Webber claimed line honours as the first man home, just over a second ahead of Lewis Hamilton. Rubens Barrichello led Kamui Kobayashi across the line before the German quartet of Vettel, Sutil, Schumacher and Hülkenberg completed the points. The Ferraris of Alonso and Massa finished fourteenth and fifteenth, one minute down and the last drivers to finish on the lead lap. Jarno Trulli was the first driver for the new teams to finish, ahead of teammate Kovalainen and the sole surviving Virgin of Glock and the two Hispanias. Despite being classified two laps behind race winner Webber, Timo Glock was within sight of the Lotuses when he crossed the line as the Australian had passed him close to the end of the final lap.

Post-race
Race winner Mark Webber was still outspoken about the apparent favouritism within the Red Bull team; his first words after crossing the line were, "Fantastic, guys, not bad for a number two driver. Cheers.", whilst in the press conference he expressed dissatisfaction with the team, claiming that he never would have signed a contract for 2011 if he had known he would have been treated the way he had been. Elsewhere, Ferrari and Alonso accepted their penalty for the pass on Kubica, claiming that if harsh penalties were to be issued, then Silverstone was an example of how it should be done, briefly reigniting the controversy associated with the previous race.

Classification

Qualifying

Notes:
1. – Vitantonio Liuzzi was demoted five places on the grid after he was penalised for impeding Nico Hülkenberg.

Race

Championship standings after the race

Drivers' Championship standings

Constructors' Championship standings

 Note: Only the top five positions are included for both sets of standings.

See also 
 2010 Silverstone GP2 Series round
 2010 Silverstone GP3 Series round

References

External links

British
British Grand Prix
Grand Prix
July 2010 sports events in the United Kingdom